Jingxi Subdistrict is a subdistrict in Shunqing District, Nanchong, Sichuan province, China. , it administers the following seven residential neighborhoods and three villages:
Neighborhoods
Huachang Community
Sangzhou Community
Xincheng Community
Jingyuan Community
Guanyinci Community
Wenchanggong Community
Wenyuan Community

Villages
Tanguanyao Village
Maoshuiyan Village
Xiexing Village

See also 
 List of township-level divisions of Sichuan

References 

Township-level divisions of Sichuan
Nanchong